Hakea multilineata, commonly known as grass-leaved hakea, is a shrub in the family Proteaceae. It is endemic  to an area in the Wheatbelt and Goldfields-Esperance regions of Western Australia.
It has pink to red long racemes in upper leaf axils and leathery linear leaves.

Description
Flowering occurs from June to September producing vibrant pink flowers, which are known for attracting local birds. This flora is also evergreen, retaining its leaves all year round providing an excellent addition to backyards and gardens. The smooth fruit are ovoid in shape tapering to a small beak. They may be found in clusters or spaced along the branchlets.
Hakea multilineata is tolerant of medium frosts and grows best in an open sunny position that is very well drained.

Taxonomy and naming
The species was first formally described by Swiss botanist Carl Meisner in 1848 and the description was published in Plantae Preissianae. Its name is said to be derived from the Latin multus - "many", and linea - "fine, parallel lines", referring to the veins in the leaf. The classical Latin linea is not a plural, but a singular, meaning "line".

Distribution and habitat
Grass-leaved hakea grows from Dalwallinu and south to Ravensthorpe and east to the Shire of Yilgarn in scrubland or low woodland on laterite ridges or sandy to gravelly loams. An ornamental species and spectacular in bloom, attracting nectar-loving birds.

Conservation status
Hakea multilineata is classified as "not threatened" by the Western Australian Government.

References

multilineata
Eudicots of Western Australia
Plants described in 1848